Division No. 17 is a census division in Alberta, Canada. It spans the central and northwest portions of northern Alberta and its largest urban community is the Town of Slave Lake. Division No. 17 is the largest census division in Alberta according to area and also has the lowest population density.

Census subdivisions 
The following census subdivisions (municipalities or municipal equivalents) are located within Alberta's Division No. 17.

Towns
High Level
High Prairie
Manning
Rainbow Lake
Slave Lake
Swan Hills
Villages
Hines Creek
Nampa
Hamlets
Fort Vermilion
La Crete
Zama City
Specialized municipalities
Mackenzie County
Municipal districts
Big Lakes County
Clear Hills County
Lesser Slave River No. 124, M.D. of
Northern Lights, County of
Northern Sunrise County
Opportunity No. 17, M.D. of
Indian reserves
Beaver Ranch 163 which is part of the Tallcree First Nation.
Boyer 164
Bushe River 207 which is part of Dene Tha' First Nation.
Child Lake 164A which is part of the Beaver First Nation.
Clear Hills 152C which is part of the Horse Lake First Nation.
Drift Pile River 150 which is part of Driftpile First Nation also known as Driftpile Cree Nation
Fort Vermilion 173B which is part of Tallcree First Nation.
Fox Lake 162 which is part of the Little Red River Cree Nation.
Hay Lake 209 which is part of the Dene Tha' First Nation.
Jean Baptiste Gambler 183 which is part of the Bigstone Cree Nation.
John d'Or Prairie 215 which is part of the Little Red River Cree Nation.
Kapawe'no First Nation 
Kapawe'no 150B, historically known as Freeman 150B, which is part of the Kapawe'no First Nation.
Kapawe'no 230, also known as, which is part of the Kapawe'no First Nation. 
Kapawe'no 150C also known as Halcro 150C, which is part of the which is part of the Kapawe'no First Nation.
Pakashan 150D
Loon Lake 235
Sawridge 150G
Sawridge 150H
Sucker Creek 150A
Swan River 150E
Tall Cree 173
Tall Cree 173A
Upper Hay River 212
Utikoomak Lake 155
Utikoomak Lake 155A
Wabasca 166
Wabasca 166A
Wabasca 166B
Wabasca 166C
Wabasca 166D
Woodland Cree 226
Woodland Cree 228
Indian settlements
Carcajou
Desmarais
John D'Or Prairie
Little Buffalo
Paddle Prairie

Demographics 

See also 
List of census divisions of Alberta
List of communities in Alberta

References 

Census divisions of Alberta
Peace River Country